Stenoptilia bassii is a moth of the family Pterophoridae. It is found in Italy, where it was discovered in the Aosta Valley.

References

bassii
Endemic fauna of Italy
Moths described in 2002
Plume moths of Europe
Taxa named by Ernst Arenberger